Romano Micelli (born 24 February 1940) is an Italian footballer who played as a defender. On 1 May 1965, he represented the Italy national football team on the occasion of a friendly match against Wales in a 4–1 home win.

References

1940 births
Italian footballers
Italy international footballers
Association football defenders
Serie A players
Serie B players
U.S. Catanzaro 1929 players
Calcio Foggia 1920 players
Bologna F.C. 1909 players
S.S.C. Napoli players
S.S. Arezzo players
Living people
People from Basiliano